Sutton Grange may refer to:

Sutton Grange, North Yorkshire, a small settlement in North Yorkshire, England
Sutton Grange, Victoria, a small country town in Victoria, Australia
Sutton Grange, a settlement in Ellington High and Low